George Eric Gordon (29 July 1905– 6 June 1992) was an Anglican bishop in the 20th century.

He was born on 29 July 1905 and educated at St Olave's Grammar School and the St Catharine's College, Cambridge. Ordained in 1929 he began his career  with a curacy at Holy Trinity, Leicester, after which he was Vice-Principal of Bishop Wilson College, Isle of Man. In 1935 he became Chaplain to William Stanton Jones, Bishop of Sodor and Man. In 1942 he  became Rector of Kersal then Rural Dean of Middleton. From 1951 to 1966 he was Provost of Chelmsford Cathedral and Rector of Chelmsford when he was ordained to the episcopate as the Bishop of Sodor and Man, a post he held for eight years.

In 1974 he retired to Eynsham in Oxfordshire.  He died on 6 June 1992.

References

1905 births
1992 deaths
People educated at St Olave's Grammar School
Alumni of St Catharine's College, Cambridge
Anglican provosts of the Diocese of Egypt
20th-century Church of England bishops
Bishops of Sodor and Man
Provosts and Deans of Chelmsford
Deans of Peel